Ethinylestradiol/norethisterone acetate (EE/NETA), or ethinylestradiol/norethindrone acetate, is a combination of ethinylestradiol (EE) and norethisterone acetate (NETA) which is used as birth control and menopausal hormone therapy. EE is an estrogen, while norethisterone acetate (NETA) is a progestin. It is taken by mouth. Some preparations of EE/NETA used in birth control additionally contain an iron supplement in the form of ferrous fumarate.

In 2020, it was the 45th most commonly prescribed medication in the United States, with more than 14million prescriptions. It is available as a generic medication.

Society and culture

Brand names
Brand names of EE/NETA include Anovlar, Blisovi, Cumorit, Estrostep, FemHRT, Fyavolv, Gildess, Junel, Larin, Leribane, Loestrin, Lo Loestrin (Lo Lo), Mibelas, Microgestin, Minastrin, Norlestrin, Primodos, Taytulla, and Tri-Legest, among others.

In addition, the combination is sold in the United States under the brand name FemHRT for use in menopausal hormone therapy.

See also
 Estradiol/norethisterone acetate
 Oral contraceptive formulations
 List of combined sex-hormonal preparations
 Nand Peeters

References

External links
 

Combined oral contraceptives
AbbVie brands